Anna Jennings-Edquist (born 13 April 1985) is an Australian lawyer, journalist, actress, playwright and director in both theatre and television. Jennings-Edquist has written and directed several Australian university and festival productions and is known for her acting roles on the popular soap opera Neighbours.

Career
Jennings-Edquist has acted in several television roles, most prominently in the soap opera Neighbours, in which she played the roles of Tahnee Coppin and Lisa Hayes. She wrote and directed The Throwback Players' 2006 production of Heat, and also directed the 2006 University of Melbourne Law Revue. She also appeared in The Pacific, "Ricketts Lane" and Lowdown on ABC1.

Since 2011, Jennings-Edquist has worked as a solicitor. She is Senior Associate at Slater and Gordon.

Personal life
Jennings-Edquist's mother is Dr Gael Jennings, a science and medical journalist and current affairs presenter. Jennings-Edquist dated radio and TV celebrity Hamish Blake for five years until 2010. She has two sisters: Grace Jennings-Edquist, a writer and online reporter for the Australian Broadcasting Corporation, and Lola.

She is a graduate of the University of Melbourne, where she completed a Law/Arts degree and an honours degree. She graduated in 2010.

Filmography

Television

Theatre

References

External links
 

1985 births
Australian television actresses
Australian child actresses
Living people
Australian women lawyers
Melbourne Law School alumni
21st-century Australian lawyers